This list of tallest Hindu statues includes completed statues that are at least  tall. The height values in this list are measured to the highest part of the murti, but exclude the height of any pedestal (plinth), or other base platform as well as any mast, spire, or other structure that extends higher than the tallest figure in the monument.

Heights stated are those of the statue itself and (separately) the total height of the monument that includes structures the statue is standing on or holding. Monuments that contain statues are included in this list only if the statue fulfills these and the height criteria.

Existing statues 

As of 2022, the main table includes 94 statues of height  or taller.

By country/region

Proposed or under construction

See also 
 Murti
 List of statues
 List of tallest bridges
 List of tallest buildings
 List of tallest statues
 List of tallest structures
 List of the tallest statues in the United States
 List of the tallest statues in India
 List of colossal sculpture in situ
 New7Wonders of the World
 List of largest monoliths

References

External links 
 Top 10 highest monuments – Architecture Portal News 
 Top highest monuments in the World 
 中國13尊大佛
 The tallest statues in the world – Video By Top 10 Hindi

 
 
Statues
Statues
Hinduism-related lists